South Dakota wine refers to wine made from grapes grown in the U.S. state of South Dakota. Its region stretches between the latitudes of 42°N and 45°N sharing these latitudes with some of the most famous wine-producing areas in the world, including Bordeaux and Italy's Tuscany. South Dakota has a small wine industry, which must contend with extremes of heat in the summer and cold in the winter. The only grape species that naturally performs well in South Dakota is Vitis riparia, a species not generally used for wine production. The wineries in South Dakota have focused exclusively on cold-resistant French hybrid grapes.  At present, there are no American Viticultural Areas (AVAs) in South Dakota, save for the state-level appellation.

See also
American wine
 List of breweries and wineries in South Dakota

References

 
Wine regions of the United States by state
Tourism in South Dakota
Agriculture in South Dakota